The 2022 All-Australian team represents the best performed Australian Football League (AFL) players during the 2022 season. It will be announced on 24 August as a complete Australian rules football team of 22 players. The team is honorary and does not play any games.

Selection panel
The selection panel for the 2022 All-Australian team consisted of chairman Gillon McLachlan, Kane Cornes, Glen Jakovich, Chris Johnson, Cameron Ling, Brad Scott, Gerard Healy, Nick Riewoldt, Jude Bolton, and Andrew Dillon.

Team

Initial squad

Final team
The final team was announced on Wednesday, 24 August.

Note: the position of coach in the All-Australian team is traditionally awarded to the coach of the premiership team.

References

All-Australian team